Manuel "Manolo" Alfaro de la Torre (born 19 January 1971) is a Spanish retired footballer who played as a striker, and a manager.

His 14-year professional career was mainly associated with Hércules, for which he scored 55 official goals whilst competing in all three major levels of Spanish football.

Playing career
Born in Alcalá de Henares, Community of Madrid, Alfaro made his professional debuts with the club at which he finished his football formation, Atlético Madrid. He played rarely for the Colchoneros first team, with 18 of his 24 appearances coming in the 1992–93 season, and was also loaned to Real Valladolid during his stint in the Spanish capital.

Alfaro signed for Hércules CF in 1994, scoring 20 Segunda División goals in his first two seasons combined, including 12 in the 1995–96 campaign en route to a La Liga return after a ten-year absence for the Alicante side. In the following year he netted a career-best 15 goals, but they were immediately relegated back.

In 1998–99, Alfaro produced another solid season in the top flight, now with Villarreal CF (35 games and 12 goals), but suffered another relegation. After years battling with chronic tendinitis he decided to retire from football in December 2002, aged only 31; his last club was Hércules, now in Segunda División B.

Coaching career
After his retirement, Alfaro coached mainly in amateur football. In the 2004–05 season he worked alongside former Hércules teammate Josip Višnjić at hometown's RSD Alcalá, acting as director of football, youth coordinator and first-team assistant manager for the third division team; in the following year, he returned to his main club Hércules as a scout.

After two seasons in Tercera División with as many sides, Alfaro again worked with Hércules, as director of football. In 2009–10 he returned to coaching duties in the tier where he left off, with Talavera CF, but the club folded soon after. In November 2010 he was appointed at another fourth level team, CD Toledo.

Honours
PlayerAtlético MadridCopa del Rey: 1991–92HérculesSegunda División: 1995–96

ManagerToledo'
Tercera División: 2010–11

References

External links

1971 births
Living people
People from Alcalá de Henares
Spanish footballers
Footballers from the Community of Madrid
Association football forwards
La Liga players
Segunda División players
Segunda División B players
RSD Alcalá players
Atlético Madrid B players
Atlético Madrid footballers
Real Valladolid players
Hércules CF players
Villarreal CF players
Real Murcia players
Spain youth international footballers
Spanish football managers
Segunda División B managers
CD Toledo managers
Spanish expatriate football managers
Spanish expatriate sportspeople in Bolivia
Expatriate football managers in Bolivia